G. Adams House is a registered historic building in Millersburg, Ohio, listed in the National Register on 1984-07-17.

It is a two-and-a-half-story building with Eastlake-style detailing in its front porch and gabled eaves.  It was home of George Adams, president of the J. & G. Adams Bank, founded in Millersburg in 1870.

Historic uses 
Single Dwelling

Notes 

Houses on the National Register of Historic Places in Ohio
Houses in Holmes County, Ohio
National Register of Historic Places in Holmes County, Ohio